James Max Michalczik (born June 6, 1966) in an American football coach who is currently the offensive line coach for the Oregon State Beavers. He was previously the offensive line coach with the California Golden Bears from 2002-2008, offensive coordinator/offensive line coach from 2011-2013 and offensive line coach with the Arizona Wildcats from 2014-2017  He was the offensive line coach for the Oakland Raiders from 2009-2010.

On January 16, 2013, Arizona hired Michalczik as offensive line coach.

References

External links
 Arizona profile
 California profile

1966 births
Living people
American football offensive guards
Arizona Cardinals players
California Golden Bears football coaches
Oakland Raiders coaches
Washington State Cougars football players
Arizona Wildcats football coaches
Miami Hurricanes football coaches
Montana State Bobcats football coaches
Oregon State Beavers football coaches